Michael Church is a Grenadian politician. He was the Minister of Trade and the Environment.

He was demoted in November 2010 after a trip to Italy. He resigned after he boycotted his own swearing-in ceremony.

External links
 Cabinet Minister resigns in Grenada

21st-century Grenadian politicians
Living people
Government ministers of Grenada
Year of birth missing (living people)
Place of birth missing (living people)